In Christianity, a rite can refer to a sacred ceremony (such as anointing of the sick), which may or may not carry the status of a sacrament depending on the Christian denomination (in Roman Catholicism, anointing of the sick is a sacrament while in Lutheranism it is not). This use of rite is distinct from reference to liturgical ritual families such as the Byzantine and Latin liturgical rites.

Catholicism 

Within the Catholic Church, "rite" often refers to what is also called a sacrament and respective liturgies based on liturgical languages and traditional local customs as well as the ceremonies associated with the sacraments. In Christian Catholicism, for example, the sacrament of Anointing of the Sick/Last Rites is one of the sacramental rites because they are administered to someone who is or was dying. The other are Penance and Eucharist (administered as Viaticum in the case of a dying person). Since the Second Vatican Council, anointing of the sick is administered to those who are seriously ill but not necessarily in immediate danger of death. Another example is the Rite of Christian Initiation of Adults. The term "rite" became widely used after the Second Vatican Council. While "rite" is often associated when receiving a "sacrament," it is technically incorrect to say that one received a "rite" because the sacrament is what is received while a rite is performed. The ritual consists of the prayers and actions that the minister of the sacrament performs when administering a sacrament. Therefore, it is incorrect to say that one has received "the last rites" as that person has really received "the last sacraments" by a minister following a ritual that has performed the "sacramental rite."

Protestantism
Within many Protestant Christian denominations, the word rite is often used specifically for important ceremonies that are not considered sacraments or ordinances. The 39 Articles of the Anglican Communion and the Articles of Religion of the Methodist Church state "there are two Sacraments ordained of Christ our Lord in the Gospel, that is to say, Baptism and the Supper of the Lord". As such, in the Anglican and Methodist traditions, the following are considered rites: "confirmation, reconciliation (confessions of sins), matrimony, holy orders and anointing of the sick". Similarly the "rites of the Moravian Church are Confirmation, Marriage, and Ordination". In the Lutheran tradition, Holy Baptism, Holy Eucharist, and Confession & Absolution are considered Lutheran sacraments, while Confirmation, Anointing of the Sick, Holy Matrimony, and Holy Orders are rites. As far as the liturgy is concerned, Western Lutheran churches use rites based on the Formula Missae while the Eastern Lutheran churches use the Byzantine Rite.

See also
 Funerary rites
 Marriage rites
 List of Christian liturgical rites

References

Ritual
Religious rituals
Christian worship and liturgy